Walk is the first extended play and debut recording from the husband-and-wife duo Grayson|Reed. Centricity Music released the EP on January 13, 2016, while this was their first release with the label.

Critical reception

Kevin Sparkman says "their music and message are both worth the attention." Jay Akins writes "I love this record; it's a great everyday listen or road trip album." Marie Asner states "it shows in the timing, arrangements and lyrics of their music."
 Nicole Marie Vacca says "Listeners who take on Walk will not regret it." Caitlin Lassiter writes "it's also a completely new sound that displays the duo's own style and shows how well Mike and Molly mesh musically." Brian Hunter states "The album is produced and mixed very professionally and really let’s both voices shine." Jono Davies says "It's a great record, well worth investing time in." Jonathan Andre writes "Yet in the same breath, Mike and Molly have complemented each other so seamlessly and poetically on the EP that I can’t help by enjoy and love the duo."

Track listing

Charts

References

2017 EPs
Centricity Music albums